The 1980 Wilson's Classic (December) was the second edition of the professional invitational snooker tournament, which took place on 1 and 2 December 1980.
The tournament was played at Blighty's in Farnworth, Bolton, Greater Manchester, and featured eight professional players.

Steve Davis won the tournament, beating Dennis Taylor 4–1 in the final.

Ray Reardon made the highest break of the tournament, 76, in the opening frame of the first match played.

Main draw

Final

References

Classic (snooker)
Classic
Classic
Classic
Sport in Bolton